Nicholas Vince (born May 1958) is an actor, writer, and film maker who was born in West Germany and lives in South London. He trained at Mountview Theatre Academy, and shortly after graduating he met Clive Barker, modeling for him and later being cast as The Chatterer Cenobite in Hellraiser in 1987 and in its sequel Hellbound: Hellraiser II in 1988. He subsequently played Kinski in Barker's 1990 film Nightbreed. Since 2016 he's been Patron of the London Horror Festival, the UK's original and largest festival of live horror performance. In 2016 he was awarded the "London Horror Society Award for Outstanding Contribution to UK Independent Horror" and in 2018 a "Lifetime of Torment Award" at Texas Frightmare.

For Marvel Comics he wrote stories for the Hellraiser and Nightbreed comics plus the series 'Warheads' and Mortigan Goth. He modelled for the art of John Bolton and for Dave McKean in Cages. He served as both secretary and chairman of the Comics Creators Guild. He's published two collections short stories What Monsters Do and Other People's Darkness. In 2013 he dramatised two of the stories from What Monsters Do, "Green Eyes" and "Tunes From The Music Hall". In 2017, his Hellraiser short story "Prayers for Desire" was published within Hellraiser Anthology Volume 2, detailing the origin story for The Chatterer.

He has written and directed four short films: The Night Whispered screened in the UK, USA and France; Your Appraisal is on a festival run; Necessary Evils will be included as a DVD extra on For We Are Many from Hex Studios and Kirby, A Hero for the Soska Sisters Blood Drive. In addition he has created two music videos, "We Are The Hearts" by EXGF and "We Need Blood", also for the Soska Sisters Blood Drive.

His interview series The Luggage in the Crypt appeared in the magazine Skeleton Crew. His short story "Look, See", which gives an alternative origin of the Chatterer, appeared in Fear magazine. Since 2014 he's hosted a chat show on YouTube, Chattering with Nicholas Vince, where he interviews independent film makers, writers, artists and actors.

In 2016 he starred in horror director Katie Bonham's Mindless, with 14 film festival entrances and one win so far.

Filmography
Hellraiser (1987) – The Chattering Cenobite
Hellbound: Hellraiser II (1988) – The Chatterer
Nightbreed (1990) – Kinski
The Hairy Hands (2010) – (voice)
Mindless (2016) Horror short
Hollower (2016)
Borley Rectory (2017)
Book of Monsters (2018)
Heckle (2019)
 Fuck You Immortality (2019)
 They're Outside (2020) - Richard
 Paintball Massacre (2020)

References

External links

1958 births
Living people
English male film actors
German male film actors
German emigrants to England